Kalashnyky may refer to:

 Kalashnyky (Kozelshchyna Raion), a village in Kozelshchyna Raion, Poltava Oblast, Ukraine
 Kalashnyky (Poltava Raion), a village in Poltava Raion, Poltava Oblast, Ukraine
 Kalashnyky, Dnipropetrovsk Oblast, a village in Kryvyi Rih Raion, Dnipropetrovsk Oblast, Ukraine

See also
 Kalashnik (disambiguation)